Dale Eldon "Nubs" Jones (December 17, 1918 – November 8, 1980) was a Major League Baseball pitcher. Jones played in two games for the Philadelphia Phillies in 1941. His only decision occurred in an 8–6 loss to the New York Giants on September 23, 1941.

During World War II, Jones served in the United States Navy in the Pacific. He died on November 8, 1980, and is buried in Arlington National Cemetery.

References

External links

1918 births
1980 deaths
Allentown Wings players
Baltimore Orioles (IL) players
Baseball players from Nebraska
Harlingen Hubs players
Lake Charles Skippers players
Los Angeles Dodgers scouts
Major League Baseball pitchers
Major League Baseball scouts
Memphis Chickasaws players
People from Hamilton County, Nebraska
Philadelphia Phillies players
Philadelphia Phillies scouts
Utica Blue Sox players
Wayne State Wildcats baseball players